Terence Blanchard is a self-titled album by American jazz trumpeter Terence Blanchard. This is his debut full-length album as a leader. The record was released on June 18, 1991 via Columbia label.

Reception
Scott Yanow of AllMusic stated "On the varied program, Blanchard opens and closes the set with a hymn ("Motherless Child" and "Amazing Grace"), performs four originals and comes up with personal interpretations of three standards... By the time this recording came out in 1992, Blanchard was ready to take his place as one of the trumpet giants of the '90s". Leonard Feather of Los Angeles Times commented "Trumpeter Blanchard brings new elements and an often invigorating lineup to his first album since he worked on the Spike Lee film Mo' Better Blues as arranger, trumpeter and trumpet instructor for actor Denzel Washington. There are four Blanchard originals, of which the hyperventilating "Wandering Wonder" and the hectic "Azania" are a little too effusive—the latter has an overlong drum solo. But "Tomorrow's Just a Luxury," with its easy canter, and the solemn "Sing Soweto" reveal a strong compositional talent".

Track listing

Personnel
Band
Terence Blanchard – trumpet 
Branford Marsalis – tenor saxophone (tracks: 2 3 8)
Sam Newsome – tenor saxophone (tracks: 5 7 9)
Rodney Whitaker – double bass
Jeff Watts – drums (tracks: 2 3 4)
Troy Davis – drums (tracks: 5 6 7 9)
Bruce Barth – piano

Production
Dr. George Butler – executive producer 
Delfeayo Marsalis – producer, liner notes
Bernie Grundman – mastering

Chart performance

References

External links

1991 albums
Terence Blanchard albums
Columbia Records albums
Jazz albums by American artists